The 36th Artistic Gymnastics World Championships were held in Debrecen, Hungary, in 2002 at Főnix Hall.

The team and all-around events were not contested at the 2002 Worlds. The format was similar to that of the 1992 and 1996 Worlds, with medals being awarded for the individual WAG and MAG apparatus. There were three rounds of competition: the preliminary round open to everyone; the semi-finals open to the top sixteen qualifiers; and the finals for the top eight gymnasts.

Results

Men

Floor Exercise

 In July 2003, Gervasio Deferr was stripped of his silver medal after testing positive for marijuana prior to the 2002 World Championships.

Pommel Horse

Rings

Vault

Parallel Bars

Horizontal Bar

Women

Vault

Uneven Bars

Balance Beam

Floor Exercise

Medal count

Overall

Men

Women

References

 FIG Official Results: 36th World Artistic Gymnastics Championships

World Artistic Gymnastics Championships
G
G
W
World Artistic Gymnastics Championships